The Zavala Monastery is a Serbian Orthodox monastery located in the village of Zavala on the southwestern edge of Popovo Polje, in Ravno, Bosnia and Herzegovina municipality, in southernmost part of Bosnia and Herzegovina.

Location and history

Some 55 kilometers to the east lies the town of Trebinje. The monastery is dedicated to the Presentation of Mary. The northern wall of the monastery's church is situated within a cave. This monastery is also known as a place where Basil of Ostrog entered into monasticism.

Along with Žitomislić and Tvrdoš, Zavala is one of the most important monasteries in East Herzegovina. The first written record of the monastery dates back to sixteenth century. During the Second World War, the monastery suffered major damage, and in the Bosnian War it was further damaged and abandoned.

Zavala and Vjetrenica
After the war the monastery was restored, and together with Zavala village with its old architecture and stone masonry, and Vjetrenica cave constitute cultural-historic, architectural and natural assemble, protected by KONS as an important national monument of Bosnia and Herzegovina. Because of its importance as national heritage, as well as tourist and ambiental attraction, site is also placed on the UNESCO Tentative list for inscription into UNESCO World Heritage Site list.

See also
 Popovo Polje
 Vjetrenica
 Trebišnjica
 Ravno

References

Further reading
 Туристичка организација Републике Српске: Манастир Завала (National Tourist Organization of Serbian Republic: Zavala Monastery) 
 Туризам Републике Српске: Манастир Завала (Serbian Republic Tourism) 
 Епархија захумско-херцеговачка: Манастир Завала (Diocese of Zahumlje-Herzegovina: Zavala Monastery)

External links

Tourist attractions in Bosnia and Herzegovina
World Heritage Tentative List for Bosnia and Herzegovina
Protected areas of Bosnia and Herzegovina
National Monuments of Bosnia and Herzegovina
16th-century Serbian Orthodox church buildings
Christian monasteries established in the 16th century
16th-century establishments in Bosnia and Herzegovina
Serbian Orthodox monasteries in Bosnia and Herzegovina
Attacks on religious buildings and structures during the Bosnian War
Attacks on religious buildings and structures during World War II
Popovo Polje